Tano District is a former district that was located in Brong-Ahafo Region (now currently in Ahafo Region), Ghana. Originally created as an ordinary district assembly in 1988. However, on 17 February 2004, it was split off into two new districts: Tano South District (which it was elevated to municipal district assembly status in April 2018; capital: Bechem) and Tano North District (which it was also elevated to municipal district assembly status in April 2018; capital: Duayaw-Nkwanta). The district assembly was located in the southwest part of Brong-Ahafo Region (now eastern part of Ahafo Region) and had Bechem as its capital town.

Sources
 
 19 New Districts Created, November 20, 2003.

References 

2003 disestablishments in Ghana
Brong-Ahafo Region
Former districts of Ghana